The Essential Lou Reed is a compilation album by Lou Reed released in 2011 by RCA Records. The album features classic Lou Reed solo work and songs from his band the Velvet Underground. The track listing is identical to NYC Man (The Ultimate Collection 1967–2003).

Track listing

Disc 1

Disc 2

References 

Lou Reed compilation albums
2011 compilation albums
RCA Records compilation albums
Albums produced by Lou Reed
Albums produced by Hal Willner
Albums produced by Doug Yule
Albums produced by Sterling Morrison
Albums produced by Andy Warhol
Albums produced by Tom Wilson (record producer)
Albums produced by David Bowie
Albums produced by Mick Ronson
Albums produced by Bob Ezrin
Albums recorded at Electric Lady Studios
Albums recorded at Trident Studios
Albums recorded at Morgan Sound Studios